Kenzo Okada (岡田 謙三, Okada Kenzō; born on September 28, 1902, died on July 25, 1982) was a Japanese-born American painter and the first Japanese-American artist to work in the Abstract Expressionist style and receive international acclaim. At the 29th Venice Biennale in 1958, Okada’s work was exhibited in the Japan Pavilion alongside that of five other Japanese artists, and Okada won the Astorre Meyer Prize and UNESCO Prize. According to artist Michelle Stuart, "when Okada came to the United States he was already a mature painter, well considered in his native Japan. To American abstraction Okada brought civilized restraint, an elegance of device and an unusual gift for poetic transmutation of natural forms."

Okada's work has been featured in retrospective exhibitions since the 1960s, including the Albright-Knox Art Gallery in 1965, the National Museum of Modern Art, Kyoto in 1966, the Seibu Museum of Art, Tokyo in 1982, the Museum of Modern Art, Toyama in 1989, the University of Iowa Museum of Art in 2000, and the Yokohama Museum of Art in 2003. Okada’s works are also held in major public collections including Albright-Knox Art Gallery, the Brooklyn Museum, the Metropolitan Museum of Art, the Museum of Fine Arts, Boston, the Museum of Modern Art, New York, the National Gallery of Art, Washington, D.C., the National Museum of Modern Art, Tokyo, the Peggy Guggenheim Collection, the Philadelphia Museum of Art, the San Francisco Museum of Modern Art, the Solomon R. Guggenheim Museum, the Whitney Museum of American Art, among others.

Biography

Early life and education (1902–1927) 
Okada was born September 28, 1902 in Yokohama, Japan. His father, a wealthy industrialist, did not support his son's desire to be an artist. When his father died, Okada entered the department of Western painting at Tokyo School of Fine Arts (present Tokyo National University of Fine Arts and Music). His classmates include Gen'ichirō Inokuma, Takeo Yamaguchi, and Ryōhei Koiso. In 1924, Okada dropped out from Tokyo School of Fine Arts and left for Paris where he studied with fellow Japanese expatriate Tsuguharu Foujita, executing paintings of urban subjects. In 1927, he exhibited work in the Salon d'Automne.

Early career in Japan (1927–1950) 
In 1927, Okada returned to Japan and within a year he had his first one-person show at the Mitsukoshi Department Store in Tokyo. His success continued with a prize in 1936 from the modernist artist association Nika-kai, of which he became a formal member. In 1939, Okada was awarded the Showa Western Painting Encouragement Prize (昭和洋画奨励賞), and in the same year he was invited to teach oil painting at the School of Fine Arts, Nihon University with Kinosuke Ebihara and other oil painters. Later, Okada was evacuated to Miyagi Prefecture. After the war, in 1947, he was awarded the first Nikakai Group Membership Effort Prize (会員努力賞) and attracted attention for his refined, lyrical style. From that year, he taught oil painting at the Musashino Art University until 1974 and at Tama Art University until 1968.

Success as an abstract painter in the United States (1950–1982) 
In 1950, Okada moved to New York City, where he produced abstract paintings. Undoubtedly stimulated by abstract expressionism, these paintings nevertheless display a strong Japanese sensibility and feeling for form.  In 1953, he began to exhibit his abstract expressionist paintings with the Betty Parsons Gallery in New York City, and through Parsons, gained access to the inner circle of Abstract Expressionism. Okada's style and colours, which evoke the aesthetics of traditional Japanese art, were popularised under the name of Yugenism (ユーゲニズム; 幽玄主義), and he achieved great commercial and critical success as a Japanese-American artist in New York, which became the centre of postwar art at the height of the Abstract Expressionist movement. At the 29th Venice Biennale in 1958, Okada’s work was exhibited in the Japan Pavilion (representative: Shūzō Takiguchi; assistant commissioner: Ichirō Fukuzawa and Yoshiaki Tōno) alongside that of five other Japanese artists (Ichirō Fukuzawa, Kawabata Ryūshi, Seison Maeda, Yoshi Kinouchi, Shindō Tsuji), and Okada won Astorre Meyer Prize and UNESCO Prize. 

His paintings from the 1950s and 1960s reveal subtle changes in the natural world through the use of imagery constructed with delicate, sensitive color tonalities, floating within the compositional space. Turn from 1962, in the collection of the Honolulu Museum of Art, and Hagoromo from 1966, in the Governor Nelson A. Rockefeller Empire State Plaza Art Collection, are examples of the artist's tonal abstractions. During the 1970s he painted numerous works that used as a point of departure the reinterpretation of the decorative effects of traditional Japanese painting. Okada evokes the aura of landscape by using earth colors, abstract patterns hinting at rocks and flowers, and an overall haziness that makes his scenes look submerged in water. Bringing an Asian sensitivity to the New York School of abstraction, Okada distills the essence of nature into his painting, making it seem elemental and thus sublime. Okada became friends with Mark Rothko and many other abstract expressionists, especially the early color field painters. His sensitive and personal style of abstract expressionism, with his Asian roots, relates directly to both color field painting and lyrical abstraction. Okada died in Tokyo July 24, 1982.

Legacy 
The artist’s widow Okada Kimi donated 95 of the artist’s paintings to Akita City in June, 1989. In November, 1989, the Akita Senshu Museum of Art opened the Kenzo Okada Memorial (岡田謙三記念館), the special exhibition room that displays Okada’s oeuvre permanently. In 1997, Okada Kimi donated 152 paintings to the Kitasato Institute, Tokyo which now exhibits Okada’s works regularly at its Kitasato University Medical Center Ōmura Memorial Hall (北里大学メディカルセンター 大村記念館) in Saitama.

Selected exhibitions

Solo exhibitions 

 1953 Betty Parsons Gallery, New York

 1955 Betty Parsons Gallery, New York
 1956 Betty Parsons Gallery, New York
 1958 Nihonbashi Takashimaya Department Store, Tokyo
 1959 Betty Parsons Gallery, New York
 1962 Betty Parsons Gallery, New York
 1963 New Gallery, Hayden Library, Massachusetts Institute of Technology
 1964 Betty Parsons Gallery, New York
 1965 Kenzo Okada Paintings, 1931–1965, Albright-Knox Art Gallery, Buffalo Fine Arts Academy, Buffalo
 1966 Nihonbashi Takashimaya Department Store, Tokyo
 1966–1967 Kenzo Okada Paintings, 1952–1965, the National Museum of Modern Art, Kyoto, the Honolulu Academy of Arts, the M.H. de Young Memorial Museum, San Francisco, and the University Art Museum, University of Texas, Austin
 1967 Betty Parsons Gallery, New York
 1969 Betty Parsons Gallery, New York
 1971 Betty Parsons Gallery, New York
 1973 Betty Parsons Gallery, New York
 1976 Betty Parsons Gallery, New York
 1978 Betty Parsons Gallery, New York
 1982 Kenzo Okada (岡田謙三展： ニューヨークに花開く幽玄の美), Seibu Museum of Art, Tokyo, and Fukuoka Art Museum
 1989 Kenzo Okada (岡田謙三展), the Museum of Modern Art, Toyama, the Meguro Museum of Art, Tokyo, the Gunma Prefectural Museum of Modern Art, the Ohara Museum of Art, Kurashiki, the Mie Prefectural Art Museum, the Kure Municipal Museum of Art, and the Akita City Museum of Art
 2000 Kenzo Okada: A Retrospective of the American Years 1950–1982, University of Iowa Museum of Art, Iowa
 2003 Kenzo Okada: A Retrospective (生誕100年記念・没後20年: 岡田謙三展), Yokohama Museum of Art, the Akita Senshu Museum of Art, the Kobe City Koiso Memorial Museum of Art, and the Joshibi Art Museum, Joshibi Universitu of Art and Design, Sagamihara

Group exhibitions 

 1954 Young American Painters, Solomon R. Guggenheim Museum, New York
 1955 3rd São Paulo Biennale
 1958 29th Venice Biennale
 1979 Okada, Shinoda, and Tsutaka: Three Pioneers of Abstract Painting in 20th Century Japan, The Phillips Collection, Washington, D.C.

 1994－1995 Japanese Art After 1945: Scream Against the Sky, Yokohama Museum of Art, Guggenheim Museum SoHo, and San Francisco Museum of Modern Art

Major public collections 
 Akita Senshu Museum of Art
 Art Institute of Chicago

 Albright-Knox Art Gallery, Baffalo
 Brooklyn Museum, New York
 Bruce Museum, Greenwich
 Fukuoka Art Museum
 Harvard Art Museums/Fogg Museum
 Indianapolis Museum of Art
 Kitasato Institute, Tokyo
 Meguro Museum of Art, Tokyo
 Museum of Contemporary Art Tokyo
 Metropolitan Museum of Art, New York
 Museum of Fine Arts, Boston
 Museum of Modern Art, Kamakura & Hayama
 Museum of Modern Art, New York
 National Gallery of Art, Washington, D.C.
 National Museum of Art, Osaka
 National Museum of Modern Art, Kyoto
 National Museum of Modern Art, Tokyo
 Neuberger Museum of Art, New York
 Peggy Guggenheim Collection, Venice
 Philadelphia Museum of Art
 Phillips Collection, Washington, D.C.
 San Francisco Museum of Modern Art
 Santa Barbara Museum of Art
 Smithsonian American Art Museum, Washington, D.C.
 Solomon R. Guggenheim Museum, New York
 Sompo Museum of Art, Tokyo
 St. Louis Museum of Art
 Whitney Museum of American Art, New York
 Yale University Art Gallery, New Haven
 Yokohama Museum of Art

Further reading 

 Akita Senshu Museum of Art Kenzo Okada Memorial, ed. Okada Kenzō kinenkan sakuhinshū = Kenzo Okada, Akita: Akita Senshu Museum of Art Kenzo Okada Memorial, 1991.
 Kenzo Okada Paintings, 1931–1965, exh. cat., Buffalo: Buffalo Fine Arts Academy, Albright-Knox Art Gallery, 1965.
 Kenzo Okada Paintings, 1952–1965, exh. cat., Tokyo: Bijutsu shuppansha, 1967.
 Kitasato kenkyūjo kikaku chōsei-bu, ed. Okada Kenzō sakuhinshū = Kenzo Okada, Tokyo: Kitasato kenkyūjo, 1999.
 Kitayuguchi, Takao. Gaka Okada Kenzō no shōgai, Tokyo: AI Network, 2003.
 Museum of Modern Art, Toyama, et al., ed. Okada Kenzō ten = Kenzo Okada, exh. cat., Tokyo: Asahi Shinbun, 1989.
 Okada, Kenzō, ed. Okada Kenzō gashū, Tokyo: Asahi Shinbun, 1982.
 Okada, Kimi. Gaka Okada Kenzō to tomoni, Tokyo: Kajima shuppankai, 2009.
 Okada, Shinoda, and Tsutaka: Three Pioneers of Abstract Painting in 20th Century Japan, exh. cat., Washington, D.C.: Phillips Collection, 1979
 Seibu Museum of Art, and Asahi Shinbun, eds. Okada Kenzō ten: Nyūyōku ni hana hiraku yūgen no bi = Kenzo Okada, exh. cat., Tokyo: Seibu Museum of Art and Asahi Shinbun, 1982.
 Winther-Tamaki, Bert. Art in the Encounter of Nations: Japanese and American Artists in the Early Postwar Years, Honolulu: University of Hawai’i Press, 2001.
 Yokohama Museum of Art, et al., eds. Okada Kenzō ten: Seitan 100-nen kinen botsugo 20-nen = Kenzo Okada: A Retrospective, exh. cat., Yokohama: Yokohama Museum of Art, 2003.
 Zlatnik, Gail, ed. Kenzo Okada: A Retrospective of the American Years 1950–1982, exh. cat., Iowa: University of Iowa Museum of Art, 2000.

External links 
 Oral history interview with Kenzo Okada, November 22, 1968. Conducted by Forrest Selvig. Archives of American Art, Smithsonian Institution, Washington, D.C.

References

1902 births
1982 deaths
20th-century American painters
American male painters
American artists of Japanese descent
Japanese emigrants to the United States
Japanese painters
Japanese expatriates in France
People from Yokohama
20th-century American male artists